Christopher Dawes (born 31 May 1974 in Kingston, Jamaica) is a retired Jamaican footballer. He was known to be very disciplined, a good passer of the ball and a tight man-marker.

Club career
Nicknamed 'Simba', Dawes has played as a defender or midfielder, starting his career at Jamaican club Galaxy F.C. and having a brief spell at Belgian Fourth Division club SVD Handzame in 1996. In 2001, he signed for MLS club MetroStars only to be traded to Colorado Rapids for a 2002 draft pick. Dawes returned to Jamaica in 2002 joining May Pen based club Hazard United and had a brief stint with Village United before returning to the previous club, now relocated and called Portmore United. He retired in 2006 to become a coach.

International career
He also played for the Jamaica national football team and was a participant at the 1998 FIFA World Cup. He played his last international in 2001 against Costa Rica and earned over 60 caps for the Reggae Boyz. He scored once in a 2000 friendly match against Cayman Islands, which Jamaica won by 6–0.

Coaching career
He is currently manager of Jamaica National Premier League side Sporting Central Academy but is currently on an educational sabbatical working on his coaching badges in the United States and England. In 2010, Dawes returned to coaching Sporting Central Academy.

References

1974 births
Living people
Sportspeople from Kingston, Jamaica
Jamaican footballers
Jamaican expatriate footballers
Jamaica international footballers
1998 CONCACAF Gold Cup players
1998 FIFA World Cup players
2000 CONCACAF Gold Cup players
Colorado Rapids players
Portmore United F.C. players
Expatriate soccer players in the United States
Major League Soccer players
Association football midfielders
Association football defenders